George William Keach (12 July 1824 – 10 February 1893) was an Australian politician.

Keach was born in England in 1824. In 1870 he was elected to the Tasmanian House of Assembly, representing the seat of Campbell Town. He served until 1882, when his re-election was invalidated. He died in 1893 in Ross.

References

1824 births
1893 deaths
Members of the Tasmanian House of Assembly